Solar power in Lithuania is a form of renewable energy in Lithuania, and created 39 GWh of electricity in the first nine months of 2013.  At 2021 Lithuania had capacity of 338 MW of solar power.

Lithuania has 1,580 small (from several kilowatts to 2,500 kW) solar power plants with a total installed capacity of 59.4 MW which produce electricity for the country, and has an uncounted number of private power plants which make electricity only for their owners.

See also
 Energy in Lithuania
 Renewable energy in Lithuania
 Wind power in Lithuania
 Renewable energy by country

References

External links
 Renewable Energy production in Lithuania